Kreis Pernau (Pärnu kreis, Перновский уезд) was one of the nine subdivisions of the Governorate of Livonia of the Russian Empire. It was situated in the northwestern part of the governorate (in present-day southwestern Estonia). The territory of Kreis Pernau corresponds to most of the present-day Pärnu County and parts of Viljandi and Rapla counties.

Demographics
At the time of the Russian Empire Census of 1897, Kreis Pernau had a population of 98,123. Of these, 94.0% spoke Estonian, 3.7% German, 1.1% Russian, 0.7% Latvian, 0.4% Yiddish and 0.1% Polish as their native language.

References